Kenneth Lewis Judd (born March 24, 1953) is a computational economist at Stanford University, where he is the Paul H. Bauer Senior Fellow at the Hoover Institution. He received his PhD in economics from the University of Wisconsin in 1980. He is perhaps best known as the author of Numerical Methods in Economics, and he is also among the editors of the Handbook of Computational Economics and of the Journal of Economic Dynamics and Control.

He is one of two authors behind the Chamley–Judd result that the optimal tax rate on capital income is zero.

References

External links
 Kenneth Judd's homepage
 
 Kenneth L. Judd (1980) Four Essays in Economic Theory. Ph.D. dissertation, University of Wisconsin-Madison.
 Jess Gaspar and Kenneth L. Judd (1997). "Solving Large-Scale Rational-Expectations Models," Macroeconomic Dynamics, 1(1), pp. 45–75, Abstract.
 Kenneth L. Judd (1997).  "Computational Economics and Economic Theory: Substitutes or Complements?"  Journal of Economic Dynamics and Control, 21(6), pp. 907–942. Abstract.
 (1998). Numerical Methods in Economics, MIT Press.  Description and chapter-preview links.
 (2006). "Computationally Intensive Analyses in Economics," Handbook of Computational Economics, v. 2, ch. 17, pp. 881– 93. .
 Leigh Tesfatsion and Kenneth L. Judd, ed., 2006. Handbook of Computational Economics, v. 2, Elsevier. Description & and chapter-preview links.

1953 births
Living people
21st-century American economists
Computational economists
Fellows of the Econometric Society
Hoover Institution people
University of Wisconsin–Madison College of Letters and Science alumni